Scott Lutrus (born April 23, 1988) is a former American football linebacker. He played college football for the University of Connecticut. After college, he was signed by the Jacksonville Jaguars as an undrafted free agent in 2011. After time on various practice squads, he joined the Brooklyn Bolts of the Fall Experimental Football League (FXFL).

Early years
Lutrus grew up and attended high school in Brookfield, Connecticut. In football, he was named to the all-state team by the New Haven Register during his senior year, and was named the 2006 Connecticut Gatorade Player of the Year after rushing for 2,017 yards and 34 touchdowns, as well as 63 tackles and four interceptions (two returned for touchdowns) playing defense. He was ranked as a two-star recruit. During his junior year, Brookfield fell short of a league title after losing to the undefeated state champion Pomperaug Panthers in the SWC Championship game.

College career
Lutrus played college football at the University of Connecticut, where he majored in economics and was a four-year starter on the team. He redshirted in 2006, but he became a starter in 2007 at the strongside linebacker position, accumulating 106 tackles. He was the first player since 1999 to be named the Big East Defensive Player of the Week in back-to-back weeks, and after the season he was named to the Freshman All-America team. In 2008, he led the team in tackles at the same position and was named to the All-Big East second team. In 2009 and 2010, a recurring neck injury kept him sidelined for eight games, but he was a team captain each year and recorded 69 and 59 tackles, respectively.

Professional career

Jacksonville Jaguars
Lutrus was projected to go as high as the fifth round in the 2011 NFL Draft, but ended up being undrafted, and he was considered one of the top undrafted players available. After the 2011 NFL lockout ended, Lutrus was quickly signed by the Jacksonville Jaguars as a middle linebacker. He was projected to be a special teams player and backup linebacker, but was released on September 2.

St. Louis Rams
Lutrus was signed to the Rams' practice squad on September 5, 2011.

Indianapolis Colts
Lutrus was signed off of the Rams' practice squad by the Colts on November 29, 2011. He was placed on injured reserve on August 14, 2012. On August 1, 2013, Lutrus was waived/injured by the Colts.

Brooklyn Bolts
After being waived by the Colts, Lutrus joined the Brooklyn Bolts of the Fall Experimental Football League (FXFL).

References

Further reading

External links
"Scott Lutrus," Jacksonville Jaguars, accessed August 15, 2011.

1988 births
Living people
American football middle linebackers
American football outside linebackers
Brooklyn Bolts players
UConn Huskies football players
Indianapolis Colts players
Jacksonville Jaguars players
People from Brookfield, Connecticut
Players of American football from Connecticut
St. Louis Rams players